Herman "Hecky" Krasnow (February 15, 1910 – April 23, 1984) was a record producer of Rudolph the Red Nosed Reindeer, Frosty the Snowman, and the Frank Buck recording Tiger.

Early years
Krasnow was born in Hartford, Connecticut, son of Harry Krasnow, founder of the National Iron Works (later National Steel Products), and Sarah Wohl Krasnow. Hecky Krasnow studied violin at the Juilliard School under Leopold Auer. He was a talented violinist, highly praised for the range of his repertoire.

Record Producer
Krasnow was a producer for Columbia Records from 1949 to 1956, when he became a free-lance writer and producer. His compositions included "Rendezvous d'Amour", "I Just Can't Wait 'Til Christmas" and "The Happy Cobbler". He was the producer of the Columbia recordings of "Rudolph the Red-Nosed Reindeer and "Frosty the Snowman", sung by Gene Autry; the songs of Burl Ives and Captain Kangaroo, "The Ballad of Davy Crockett" and "Smokey the Bear". He also produced "I'm Gettin' Nuttin' for Christmas" and "I Saw Mommy Kissing Santa Claus". Krasnow worked with Gene Kelly, Jackie Robinson, Rosemary Clooney ("Come On-a My House"), Dinah Shore, Nina Simone, Art Carney, Jose Ferrer, and Arthur Godfrey. He also produced the first LP by the Chad Mitchell Trio on Colpix (At the Blue Angel; he is listed as producer on the LP back cover)

Work with Frank Buck
In 1950, Krasnow wrote and produced the Frank Buck recording Tiger''.

Later years
Krasnow died aged 74 in Miami, Florida.

Biography
Krasnow's daughter, Judy Gail Krasnow, has written a biography of her father.

References

1910 births
1984 deaths
Record producers from Connecticut
American male violinists
Songwriters from Connecticut
Businesspeople from Hartford, Connecticut
20th-century American violinists
20th-century American businesspeople
Songwriters from New York (state)
20th-century American male musicians
American male songwriters